Kenya has attended sixteen Commonwealth Games, beginning in 1954 and missing only the 1986 Games. Kenya has won 237 Commonwealth Games medals, mostly in athletics and boxing, with thirty-four coming from a single event, the 3000 metre steeplechase, an event in which no athlete but a Kenyan has won a medal since 1994.

Medals

References

 
Kenya and the Commonwealth of Nations
Nations at the Commonwealth Games